The 2020 Associate international cricket season was from May to August 2020. All official twenty over matches between Associate members of the ICC were eligible to have full Twenty20 International (T20I) or Women's Twenty20 International (WT20I) status, as the International Cricket Council (ICC) granted T20I status to matches between all of its members from 1 July 2018 (women's teams) and 1 January 2019 (men's teams). The season included all T20I/WT20I cricket series mostly involving ICC Associate members, that were played in addition to series covered in International cricket in 2020. On 24 March, ICC announced that all qualifying events scheduled to take place before 30 June had been postponed due to the ongoing COVID-19 pandemic, including the 2020 ICC T20 World Cup Europe Qualifiers and the 2020 ICC T20 World Cup Asia Eastern Region Qualifier.

Season overview

May

2020 Women's Central American Cricket Championship
The tournament was cancelled due to the COVID-19 pandemic.

Romania in Belgium
The series was postponed in March 2020 due to the COVID-19 pandemic.

June

2020 ICC T20 World Cup Asia Qualifier B

The tournament was postponed due to the COVID-19 pandemic.

2020 Women's Twenty20 Asia Cup Qualifier

This tournament was postponed due to the COVID-19 pandemic.

August

Germany women in Austria

2020 ICC T20 World Cup Americas Qualifier

This tournament was postponed due to the COVID-19 pandemic.

Isle of Man in Guernsey

2020 T20I Nordic Cup

The Nordic Cup was cancelled a week before it was due to begin due to travel restrictions resulting from increasing COVID-19 infection rates in Denmark.

2020 Luxembourg T20I Trophy

2020 ICC T20 World Cup Europe Qualifier A

This tournament was postponed due to the COVID-19 pandemic.

2020 ICC T20 World Cup Europe Qualifier B

This tournament was postponed due to the COVID-19 pandemic.

2020 ICC T20 World Cup Europe Qualifier C

This tournament was postponed due to the COVID-19 pandemic.

2020 Asia Cup Qualifier

The 2020 Asia Cup was postponed to June 2021, and the qualifier to an unknown date, due to the COVID-19 pandemic.

See also
 International cricket in 2020
 Impact of the COVID-19 pandemic on cricket

Notes

References

2020 in cricket